Richard Whiteley was a British broadcaster.

Richard Whiteley, Whitelegh, or Whitley may also refer to:

Richard H. Whiteley (1830–1890), U.S. Representative and U.S. Senator-elect from Georgia
Richard Whitelegh, Member of Parliament (MP) for Dartmouth and Totnes
Richard Whitley, American screenwriter and producer